Diósdi Torna Club is a professional football club based in Diósd, Pest County, Hungary, that competes in the Nemzeti Bajnokság III, the third tier of Hungarian football.

Name changes
1919–?: Diósdi Torna Club
?–?: Diósdi Csapágy-gyári Vasas
1990–?: Diósdi Torna Club
?–present: Diósdi Torna Club-SELECT

References

External links
 Official website of Diósdi TC
 Profile on Magyar Futball

Football clubs in Hungary
Association football clubs established in 1949
1949 establishments in Hungary